The Dynamic Billard Veldhoven Open 2018 (sometimes known as the 2018 Netherlands Open) was the third Euro Tour 9-Ball pool event in 2018. The event was won by Austria's Mario He who defeated Albania's Eklent Kaçi 9–8 in the final. By making the final, Eklent had made the semifinal or better of four straight events.

The previous years champion Ruslan Tschinachow did not reach the last 32 stage.

Tournament format
The event saw a total of 228 players compete, in a double-elimination knockout tournament, until the last 32 stage; where the tournament was contested as single elimination.

Prize fund 
The tournament prize fund was similar to that of other Euro Tour events, with €4,500 for the winner of the event.

Tournament results

References

External links

Euro Tour
2018 Euro Tour events